The Tongod District is an administrative district in the Malaysian state of Sabah, part of the Sandakan Division which includes the districts of Beluran, Kinabatangan, Sandakan, Telupid and Tongod. The capital of the district is in Tongod Town.

History 
The district was first established in 1977 as a sub-district of the Kinabatangan district. The "daerah kecil" ("small district") was entrusted to Keningau's Charles Andau, who was an assistant district officer and formally subordinate to the district officer of the Kinabatangan district. On 1 March 1999, Tongod was raised to become an independent district. On 24 May 1999, Major Matthew Sator of Ranau was appointed to be the first district officer. The acquisition of the status of a fully fledged district also involved the construction of a new administration building, which replaced the first secretarial building.

Demographics 

According to the last census in 2010, the population of the entire district is 35,341 inhabitants. In relation to the total area of 10,052 km², it is a sparsely populated district. Orang Sungai and Kadazan-Dusun is the major in Tongod.

Gallery

See also 
 Districts of Malaysia

References

Further reading

External links 

  Tongod District Office